Entrance to a Dutch Port is an oil on canvas painting by Dutch artist Willem van de Velde the Younger, created c. 1665. The painting depicts a bustling harbor in the Netherlands. The work is indicative of the historical mercantile power of the Netherlands during the 17th century. Entrance to a Dutch Port is in the collection of the Metropolitan Museum of Art, in New York.

Description
Entrance depicts a busy port in the Netherlands during the mid 17th century. The work is filled with details that would have been well known to Van de Velde (himself the son of a famous draftsman), such as a wooden breakwater and multiple types of ships. For the viewing audience, the painting evokes thoughts of a sunny, clear day in port with ships that have come safely home.

References

1665 paintings
Paintings by Willem van de Velde the Younger
Paintings in the collection of the Metropolitan Museum of Art
Maritime paintings